The Smârdan-class river monitor (NATO codification: Brutar II-class) is a class of riverine patrol boats in service with the Romanian Naval Forces. Five ships of this class are currently in service with the Romanian Navy.

Ships
 Rahova (F-176). Commissioned 14 April 1988
 Opanez (F-177).  Commissioned 24 July 1990
 Smârdan (F-178).  Commissioned 24 July 1990
 Posada (F-179).  Commissioned 14 May 1992
 Rovine (F-180).  Commissioned 30 July 1993

See also
Romanian Naval Forces

External links

World Navies Today

Monitor classes
Riverine warfare